The 2017 Rugby Europe Women's Sevens Trophy was the second level of international women's rugby sevens competitions organised by Rugby Europe during 2017. The competition featured two tournaments, one hosted in Ostrava and one hosted in Esztergom. Scotland won both tournaments, defeating Germany in both cup finals. Scotland and Germany were promoted to the 2018 Grand Prix series while Malta and Moldova were relegated to the 2018 Conference.

Tournament 1 (Ostrava)

Pool stage

Pool A

Pool B

Pool C

Knockout stage

Challenge Trophy

5th place

Cup

Tournament 2 (Esztergom)

Pool stage

Pool A

Pool B

Pool C

Notes
*   Moldova did not show up for the Esztergom Tournament. Their three pool opponents were awarded 25−0 wins.

Knockout round

Challenge Trophy

5th place

Cup

Final standings

Notes
   Moldova were disqualified and relegated after failing to show up at the Esztergom Tournament.

References

2017
A
Europe
Europe
2017 in Czech sport
2017 in Hungarian sport